Texana denotes both the history and culture of Texas. It may also refer to:

Places
Texana, North Carolina, an unincorporated community
Texana, Texas, a ghost town in Jackson County, Texas
Lake Texana
Lake Texana State Park

Species
Acantholespesia texana, a species of fly of the genus Acantholespesia
Atta texana, known as the Texas leafcutter ant
Bergia texana, a species of flowering plant
Catocala texanae, known as the Texan underwing moth
Celosia texana, also known as Celosia nitida, the West Indian cockscomb
Cochliopa texana, known as the phantom cave snail
Cotinis texana, refers to Cotinis mutabilis, the figeater beetle
Diospyros texana, known as the Texas persimmon, Mexican persimmon, and chapote
Euvrilletta texana, a species of beetle
Froelichia texana, a species of plant in the genus Froelichia
Gleditsia × texana, known as the Texas honey locust
Gutierrezia texana, a species of sunflower plant
Hymenoxys texana, a species of plant known as prairie dawn
Leptinotarsa texana, a species of leaf beetle of the genus Leptinotarsa
Mocis texana, known as the Texas mocis moth
Quercus texana, known as Nuttall's oak and formerly used to also refer to Texas red oak
Salamandra texana or Ambystoma texanum, known as the small-mouthed salamander
Siren intermedia texana, a sub-species of the lesser siren
Storeria dekayi texana, known as the Texas brown snake
Tartarocreagris texana, a species of arachnid
Xanthisma texana, a plant known as the sleepy daisy or the star-of-Texas